Beverly Penberthy (born May 9, 1932 in Detroit, Michigan) is an American actress, best known for her role as Pat Matthews Randolph on the soap opera Another World, which she played from 1967 to 1982.  She returned for a couple of appearances in May 1989 to coincide with the program's 25th anniversary celebration. Penberthy also played the character of Adelaide Fitzgibbons on As the World Turns in 1989.

She also had a small role in the film Judas Kiss.

References

External links 

 

American soap opera actresses
1949 births
Living people
21st-century American women